Hugo Martínez may refer to:
 Hugo Martínez (police officer), Colombian police officer tasked with apprehending the drug lord Pablo Escobar
 Hugo Martínez (boxer), Argentine boxer
 Hugo Martínez (footballer), Paraguayan footballer
 Hugo Martínez (politician), Salvadoran engineer, politician, diplomat and writer

See also 
 Hugo Soto-Martinez, American labor organizer and politician